Florence Christian School is a private, Baptist Christian school located in Florence, South Carolina, US.  It offers an academic program with a largely Christian-oriented curriculum. The school consists of four sections categorized by education: Child Development Center, Kindergarten, Elementary, and Junior and Senior high. It serves as a daycare center and school for grades Pre-K to 12th.

History
Florence Christian School was established in 1972 as a ministry of the Florence Baptist Temple to assist families in training their children spiritually and academically.  In August of that year 54 students enrolled in grades K-3.

Administration
 Principal: Jim Berry
 Academic Principal: Jimmy Miles
 Elementary Principal: Natalie Hardy
 Athletic Director: Neil Minton
 Dean of Men: Garrett Coker
 Dean of Women: Nina Bohler
 Director of the Child Development Center: Melissa Roeder

Admissions
Students already enrolled at FCS are given the first option during re-enrollment. Empty spaces are filled in the order of Florence Baptist Temple members, families with children already enrolled, and all others on first-come, first-served basis. After being accepted for enrollment, parents and the student will be interviewed by the administration to see if the student is a good candidate for admission.

Curriculum and facilities
The Florence Christian School uses a curriculum consisting of A Beka and BJU Press for grades K-12. Students have mandatory core subjects and Bible study. Various electives are also offered from 7th grade and beyond such as Personal Finance and Sports Management. Students in 11th and 12th grades can be enrolled in dual credit courses which count as up to 19 hours of college credit. Classrooms contain various technology to aid in the student's and teacher's learning and teaching. The library contains over 11,000 books and some computers for educational purposes. There are several computer labs suitable for full classes and a science lab, funded by the Drs. Bruce and Lee Foundation. Athletic facilities include a regulation gymnasium, tennis courts, football field, soccer field, softball field, and baseball field.

Athletics

Florence Christian School has fall, winter, and spring sports for both boys and girls.
Fall sports: football, girls' volleyball, girls' tennis, cheerleading
Winter sports: boys' and girls' basketball
Spring sports: baseball, softball, soccer, golf

Extracurricular activities
Florence Christian School currently offers drama, choir, yearbook, student government, and Beta Club as extracurricular activities for students.

The FCS drama class has put on several plays, including You're a Good Man, Charlie Brown, Cinderella, Cheaper by the Dozen, Anne of Green Gables, The King and I, Around the World in Eighty Days and Mary Poppins.

References

External links

Baptist schools in the United States
Buildings and structures in Florence, South Carolina
Christian schools in South Carolina
Educational institutions established in 1972
Private elementary schools in South Carolina
Private middle schools in South Carolina
Private high schools in South Carolina
Schools in Florence County, South Carolina